The 2020–21 Ghana Women's Premier League Final was an association football match which was played on 26th June 2021 Madina Astroturf in Accra, the capital of Ghana to determine winner of the Ghana Women's Premier League, the top tier women's league in Ghana. The two teams that qualified to the final were the winners of the two zones, the Northern Zone and the Southern Zone. between the two most successful women's team. At the end of the match Hasaacas Ladies won the match and won the league. Winners the final were set earn a trophy along with a cash prize of GHC50,000 and 40 gold medals, whilst qualifying for the CAF Women's Champions League.

Route to the final

Match

Background 
Hasaacas Ladies finished the season as the winners of the Southern Zone losing only a match. Ampem Darkoa Ladies emerged as the winners of the Northern Zone after going the whole season unbeaten. The two teams are the most successful women's team in Ghana. Prior to the final, Hasaacas had won the league on three occasions winning their last in 2014–15, whilst Ampem Darkoa had won the league two times last winning the league in 2017, therefore serving as the defending champions since the league was truncated in the 2018, and 2019–20 season.

Ampem Darkoa's Ophelia Serwaa Amponsah was the Championship's top scorer during the regular season with 17 goals while  Veronica Appiah and Milot Abena Pokua were Hasaacas' leading scorers with 9 goals each, followed by Doris Boaduwaa on 8.

Summary 
The match was initially set to start at 4:00pm, but due to a heavy downpour it was scheduled to 5:15 pm for kick off.

Details

References

External links 

 Ampem Darkoa Ladies 0–4 Hasaacas Ladies - Women's Premier League Finals

Women's football in Ghana
2020–21 in Ghanaian football